West Mountain Observatory (WMO) is an astronomical observatory located on West Mountain near the community of West Mountain, Utah United States, about  southwest of Provo. The observatory is owned and operated by Brigham Young University (BYU), and opened in 1981 after increasing light pollution reduced the utility of the Orson Pratt Observatory on the BYU campus.  The first year of observing with the new 0.9 m telescope included imaging of intrinsic variable stars and high-mass X-ray binaries.  Past research topics include light curve analysis of Delta Scuti variable stars and identifying pre-main-sequence stars by searching for H-alpha emitting objects.

Telescopes
 A  reflecting telescope built by DFM Engineering was installed at WMO in 2009. The main dome originally housed a 0.6 m reflector built by Tinsley Laboratories.
 A  reflector is housed in its own dome on a robotic telescope mount.
 A  reflector is housed in its own dome on a robotic telescope mount.

See also
 Willard L. Eccles Observatory
 List of astronomical observatories

References

External links
 Department of Physics and Astronomy at BYU
 West Mountain Observatory website More detailed information about WMO and some cool pictures.
 West Mountain Clear Sky Chart Forecasts of observing conditions at WMO.

Astronomical observatories in Utah
Brigham Young University
Buildings and structures in Utah County, Utah
1981 establishments in Utah